Robert Samuel Morris (born January 18, 1975) is a former professional American football linebacker who spent his entire 8-year professional career for the Indianapolis Colts of the National Football League. He played college football at Brigham Young University and was selected by the Colts in the first round (28th overall) of the 2000 NFL draft. With the Colts, Morris won Super Bowl XLI against the Chicago Bears.

Early years
Morris was born and raised in Nampa, Idaho, and graduated from Nampa High School in 1993. He was an all-state fullback for the Bulldogs in football and USA Today All-American, and also lettered in basketball and track. Morris was also an Eagle Scout and was inducted into the NHS hall of fame in 2010.

College career
Morris attended Brigham Young University (BYU) in Provo, Utah, and played college football for the Cougars. Morris was a semi-finalist for the Butkus Award and was named as a first-team All-American by the Associated Press, Sporting News, and The Football News. He earned a bachelor's degree in communications from BYU.

Professional career
In 2000, Morris was selected in the first round (28th overall) of the NFL Draft by the Indianapolis Colts, where he spent his entire career. Morris started at middle linebacker for the Colts for the first 5 years of his career, and was the Colts' leading special teams tackler in the 2006 season. Morris also started 9 games for the Colts during the 2006 season, including 3 games in the playoffs and Super Bowl XLI, replacing Gilbert Gardner to improve the Colts' run defense. In 2001, Morris had his best statistical year with 114 total tackles (84 solo) and one sack. Morris was an unrestricted free agent after the 2006 season concluded and was re-signed by Indianapolis on March 5. He injured his left knee in the fourth game of 2007, and had season-ending surgery. He was released after a failed physical on February 27, 2008.

NFL statistics

Notes and references

External links
 

1975 births
Living people
Latter Day Saints from Idaho
People from Nampa, Idaho
Players of American football from Idaho
American football outside linebackers
BYU Cougars football players
Indianapolis Colts players
Ed Block Courage Award recipients